Aggabai Sunbai is a Marathi-language television program that aired on Zee Marathi from 15 March 2021. Nivedita Joshi-Saraf, Girish Oak, Uma Pendharkar, Adwait Dadarkar, Mohan Joshi are in lead roles. It is a spin-off series of Aggabai Sasubai.

Synopsis 
It is quite the opposite to its prequel. In this season, Asavari (Nivedita Joshi-Saraf) shows an established businesswoman. Abhijeet Raje (Girish Oak) that he handles the domestic work. Shubhra (Uma Pendharkar) will be a housewife who has a son. Soham (Adwait Dadarkar) is likely to be the right hand of Asavari.

Plot 
Asavari (Nivedita Joshi-Saraf) reforms herself into a strong and affluent businesswoman and the owner of D.B.K. (Dattatray Bandopant Kulkarni) Company. She has now become disciplined and follows strict principles and rules. Abhijeet (Girish Oak) has closed down Abhi's Kitchen and has now become a house-husband. Soham (Adwait Dadarkar) have taken a job in Asavari's company as second in command. He secretly dislikes Asavari's due to her strong and changed behaviour. Soham and Shubhra (Uma Pendharkar) have a son named Shubham (Babdu). He turns out to become a spoilt brat as Soham gives bad teachings and influences to him and hence, Shubham misbehaves with Shubhra and takes her for granted.

Due to Shubham's responsibilities, Shubhra leaves her job and becomes a homemaker. During her pregnancy, her parents die which downs her morale and hence makes her shy and sensitive towards her family. Shubhra feels down due to Shubham's misbehaving with her. Soham also loses interest in Shubhra and starts an affair with his secretary Suzanne. Also, he secretly signs all reject deals by Asavari for his own profits. Asavari gives ultimatum to Shubhra to make Shubham mend his ways. Asavari foresees her past life in Shubhra and hence decides to make Shubhra independent and strong once again and make her a part of her company. Abhijeet learns about Soham's extra-marital affair with Suzanne and hence warns him. Soham breaks up with her when she misbehaved with him due to some reason but due to jealousy, he patches up with her and berates Shubhra.

Shubhra learns about Soham's affair on their wedding anniversary and confronts Suzanne, but she in turn misguides her about Soham. Shubhra confronts Soham and reveals the entire truth about having affair both-sided, but Shubhra trusts Suzanne's fake truth over Soham and asks Asavari to interfere. Suzanne ditches Shubhra in front of Asavari to deteriorate her image. Shubhra reveals all to Abhijeet and seeks help. Soham makes a scam and blame Maddy and later a worker. Shubhra interferes but gets insulted by Soham and Suzanne about her and Babdu's cost of living. Hence, Shubhra set out to recreate her identity to become independent and start working again. Meanwhile, Anurag Gokhale enter Shubhra's life when she was about to commit suicide. He tells Shubhra to live a life for herself and Babdu.

Shubhra gathers courage and questions Soham about it and asks Soham to end his relationship with Suzanne and gives him an ultimatum. Soham in the fear of Asavari fakes his breakup with Suzanne. Abhijeet learns of this and makes Shubhra aware of Soham's cheat. Shubhra decides to teach a lesson to Soham and Suzanne. Suzanne tries to gains Asavari's sympathy and confidence. On Asavari's insistence, Shubhra joins D.B.K. Company with a post equivalent to Soham. This move angers Soham and Suzanne. Suzanne tries to create a difference between Babdu and Shubhra with miserably fails. Soham gets jealous of Shubhra's friendship with Anurag and blames her character for which she retaliates and gives him a warning.

Meanwhile, Suzanne creates a fake situation and enters the Kulkarni house which angers Shubhra and Abhijeet. They both learn about Suzanne's possessive nature to get herself married with Soham. Abhijeet and Shubhra make her life troublesome by asking to do the work of housewife. Shubhra slowly starts to learn about Soham's evil deeds in the company and his black money. Shubhra asks Soham to mend his ways or else she will register a police complaint and would reveal the truth to Asavari which would lead to Soham's bankruptcy and his permanent exit from Kulkarni House.

On the occasion of Vat Pournima, Soham and Suzanne's extra-marital affair gets exposed in front of Asavari. She expels the duo for cheating Shubhra. Soham also rebels and disrespect's Asavari, Abhijeet and Shubhra. Aajoba learns about Soham's expelled and asks Asavari to change her decision by fasting which eventually degrades his health. Soham gets agitated by Asavari's actions and asks her to transfer her part of share and ownership on his accounts in order to return to Kulkarni's house for Aajoba. Soham returns and reveals his affair to Aajoba to which he retaliates. Soham is asked to end his relationship with Suzanne and return to Shubhra, but he fakes his relationship with Shubhra in front of Aajoba to seek the wealth. Soham takes in charge of the D.B.K. Company for his ill intention and illegal ways to earn money. Abhijeet & Asavari reveal that Soham has 40% of company's share and rest 60% share is with Abhijeet who later transfers to Shubhra's account making her the owner D.B.K. Company.

Asavari and Abhijeet eventually succeeds in revealing Soham's true intention to Aajoba and he expels him out of the house. Suzanne and Soham move into a rent house decide to backstab each other. Soham earlier decides not to divorce Shubhra but eventually agrees when Asavari gives him ten crore rupees. Shubham and Shubhra find solace in Anurag's company and both consider him as their best friend. Eventually, Anurag falls for Shubhra post her divorce. Suzanne frauds Soham leaving him bankrupt. Soham repents for his mistakes and tries to befriend Shubhra who Asavari strongly disagrees. On Shubhra's birthday, Anurag reveals his feelings for her and Soham reveals Asavari's deals their divorce which shocks her. Shubhra shocked with both revelation, starts maintaining a distance from Anurag. Shubhra finally realises her feelings for Anurag and asks him to stay for good. Shubhra takes charge of D.B.K. Company. Shubham dislikes Shubhra's and Anurag's marriage ideas. Hence, Anurag and Shubhra start a live-in relationship.

Cast

Main 
 Uma Pendharkar as Shubhra Soham Kulkarni - Housewife, Asavari's daughter-in-law, Abhijeet's step-daughter-in-law, Soham's ex-wife, Anurag's live-in partner, Shubham's mother.
 Nivedita Joshi-Saraf as Asavari Abhijeet Raje - Business woman, D.B.K. Foods company's boss, Abhijeet's wife, Shubhra's mother-in-law, Soham's mother
 Girish Oak as Abhijeet Raje - Homemaker, Asavari's husband, Shubhra's step-father-in-law, Soham's step-father
 Adwait Dadarkar as Soham Prabhakar Kulkarni - Right hand of Asavari, Asavari's son, Abhijeet's stepson, Shubhra's ex-husband

Recurring 
 Mohan Joshi as Dattatray Bandopant Kulkarni (Aajoba / D.B.K.) - Soham's grandfather, Asavari's father-in-law, Shubhra's grandfather-in-law
 Anvit Hardikar as Shubham Soham Kulkarni (Babdu) - Soham & Shubhra's son, Asavari & Abhijeet's grandson
 Chinmay Udgirkar as Anurag Gokhale - Leena Aajji's grandson, Shubhra's friend turned live-in partner.
 Bhakti Ratnaparakhi as Mandodari Parab (Maddy) - Asavari's assistant
 Gitanjali Ganage as Suzanne - Soham's love interest
 Shubha Godbole as Leena Gokhale (Aaji)
 Raju Bawadekar as Mr. Sheth

Production

Casting 
The first promo of the series featuring Nivedita Joshi-Saraf, Uma Pendharkar and Girish Oak from its parent show released on 22 February where Uma was introduced as the new Shubhra. The second promo of the series was released on 1 March 2021 and third promo on 8 March 2021. Adwait Dadarkar is selected for the character of Soham replacing Ashutosh Patki.

Cancellation 
This sequel was launched with much hope to garner high TRP ratings like its prequel. But due to change in actors in the role of Shubhra and Soham, the rating saw a drip. Also, the sudden change in the storyline of the show added to the cause with a massive downfall in ratings in the prime time slot. Finally on 21 August, the show aired its last episode.

References

External links 
 
 Aggabai Sunbai at ZEE5

Zee Marathi original programming
Marathi-language television shows
2021 Indian television series debuts
Indian television spin-offs
2021 Indian television series endings